Bhabra may refer to:

In people
 H. S. Bhabra (1955 - 2000), a British Asian writer and broadcaster who settled in Canada
 Sangeeta Bhabra, co-presenter of Meridian Tonight 

In places
 Bhabra, an ancient merchant community from Punjab whose population mainly follows Jainism